Gornal is a railway station on the Llobregat–Anoia Line. It is located in the neighborhood of the same name, in the L'Hospitalet de Llobregat municipality, to the south-west of Barcelona, in Catalonia, Spain. It was opened in 1987, when the line's section between Ildefons Cerdà and Sant Josep stations was put underground. It is served by Barcelona Metro line 8, Baix Llobregat Metro lines S33, S4 and S8, and commuter rail lines R5, R6, R50 and R60.

Bellvitge railway station, served by Rodalies de Catalunya commuter and regional rail services, is located adjacent to Gornal station, on the west side of it, allowing for street-level transfers between the two stations.

External links

 Information and photos of the station at trenscat.cat 
 Video on train operations at the station on YouTube

Railway stations in Spain opened in 1987
Barcelona Metro line 8 stations
Stations on the Llobregat–Anoia Line
Railway stations in L'Hospitalet de Llobregat
Railway stations located underground in Spain